These are the Billboard R&B singles chart number-one singles of 2006.

Chart history

See also
2006 in music
List of number-one R&B hits (United States)

2006
United States RandB Singles
2006 in American music